Enteromius zalbiensis is a species of ray-finned fish in the genus Enteromius.

References 

Enteromius
Taxa named by Jacques Blache
Taxa named by François Miton
Fish described in 1960